Lingshan Temple is a Buddhist temple located in Lishui, Zhejiang, China.

History
The original temple dates back to 320 during the Eastern Jin dynasty (266–420). But it was demolished in a fire in 574 during the Northern Zhou dynasty (557–581).

In 633, in the reign of Emperor Taizong of Tang in the Tang dynasty (618–907), local government reconstructed a temple on the original site named "Lingjiu Temple".

In 961, at the dawn of Song dynasty (960–1279), monk Zhusheng renovated the temple and erected the Hall of Guanyin.

Architecture
The grand temple complex include the following halls: Shanmen, Mahavira Hall, Hall of Four Heavenly Kings, Hall of Guanyin, Bell tower, Drum tower, Hall of Guru, Hall of Arhat, Dharma Hall, Dining Room, etc.

Gallery

References

Buddhist temples in Zhejiang
Buildings and structures in Lishui
Tourist attractions in Lishui